Laochra Gael ("Heroes of the Gaels") is an Irish television programme. With the 2022 series its twentieth, the show profiles and celebrates some of the greatest names in Gaelic games (hurling, Gaelic football, ladies' Gaelic football and camogie) since the 1920s; most players are from the 1980s or later due to the lack of archive footage from earlier players. Each of the programmes contains interviews with the subject, archive footage of their exploits on the pitch and an assessment from GAA experts, friends, rivals and teammates. Laochra Gael is produced by Nemeton TV and broadcast on the Irish language television station, TG4.

Episode list

Series 1 – 2001

Series 2 – 2002

Series 3 – 2004

Series 4 – 2004/05

Series 5 – 2005/06

Series 6 – 2007

Series 7 – 2008

Series 8 – 2010: Na Coimhlintí Móra (The Sagas)
Series 8 featured some of the most well-known rivalries in the games.

Series 9 – 2011: Na Coimhlintí Móra (The Sagas)
Series 9 featured more of the most well-known rivalries in the games.

Series 10 – 2012

Series 11 – 2013

Series 12 – 2014

Series 13 – 2015

Series 14 – 2016

Series 15 – 2017

Series 16 – 2018
This season saw a switch to an hour-long format.

Series 17 – 2019

Series 18 – 2020

Series 19 – 2021
This season was broadcast in two parts of six episodes. The second part of the nineteenth series began on 25 March 2021.

Series 20 – 2022

Series 21 – 2023

References

Irish Film & TV Research Online - Trinity College Dublin

External links 

Official site
"'It was put out as an accolade at funerals that a Laochra Gael had been done on them' - Irial Mac Murchú talks to The42 about the concept behind this iconic GAA documentary series"

Gaelic games television series
Irish history television shows
Irish-language television shows
2010s Irish television series
TG4 original programming
Documentary television series about sports
2001 Irish television series debuts